Five Days One Summer is a 1982 American romantic drama film directed and produced by Fred Zinnemann from a screenplay by Michael Austin, based on the 1929 short story Maiden, Maiden by Kay Boyle. Set primarily in the Alps, the story focuses on Douglas Meredith (Sean Connery) and his lover Kate (Betsy Brantley) as they embark on a mountain climbing trip, which unravels their relationship due to Kate's feelings for their mountain guide (Lambert Wilson) as well as a dark secret that looms over the couple.

Five Days One Summer served as Zinnermann's final film before his death. The film was a commercial and critical failure.

Plot
In 1932, Douglas Meredith, a middle-aged Scottish doctor, is on a mountain climbing trip in the Alps with a young woman, Kate, whom he introduces as his wife. Despite being side-eyed by their hotel's guests and staff due to their large age difference, Douglas and Kate are deeply in love, with their romance in full display. They are introduced to Johann Biari, a native of the area who becomes their mountain guide.

Flashbacks reveal that Kate is actually Douglas' niece and they are in a secret incestuous relationship. Kate had been in love with her uncle since she was a little girl, and was despondent when he had to leave to set up his practice in India when she was just a child. Years later, the adult Kate works at her family-owned shipbuilding factory which she stands to inherit from her late father, Douglas' brother, alongside Douglas. As the family reunites to discuss matters about the factory, Kate happily reunites with her uncle, who had returned from India, but she is dismayed when she meets Douglas' new wife, Sarah. Douglas and Kate rekindle their close relationship, with Kate pursuing her uncle and Douglas admiring his niece's beauty now that she has grown up. When Sarah and Kate's mother leave for a trip to the market, the two succumb to their feelings for each other and begin a romantic and sexual affair. Douglas plans for both of them to have a vacation to the Alps in the guise of family bonding so that they could pursue their relationship without their family noticing, despite Sarah's suspicions of the two.

As the couple elopes in the Alps, Kate and Douglas are happy to finally be in a place where they could be open as lovers. Johann leads Douglas and Kate around the mountains. As they return, they see a crowd of people unraveling a frozen-in-time dead body. It turns out to be the body of Johann's grand-uncle; he never returned from a trip the day before his wedding, with his bride now an elderly woman. Johann and Kate are compassionate about the reunited lovers, but Douglas is nonchalant about it.

Douglas and Kate begin having cracks in their idyllic relationship as Douglas begins pursuing more self-centered interests, while Johann and Kate begin having unspoken feelings for each other, which Douglas begins to notice. Eventually, Kate admits to Johann that she is not Douglas' wife and he is already married to someone else, though she does not disclose that they are also relatives. Johann attempts to plead with Kate that her relationship with Douglas is doomed. Kate begins to have fits of sadness and arguments with Douglas after realizing that their relationship cannot be made public even if Douglas leaves Sarah due to the taboo nature of their affair.

Later, Douglas requests Johann to guide him through a potentially dangerous climb to the top of the Maiden mountain. As the two traverse the route, Kate, disillusioned by her uncle's true personality and realizing that her relationship with him will not work out, writes a letter to Douglas on her intentions to leave him. Atop the Maiden, Johann confronts Douglas about being a married man and for using Kate, while Douglas defends himself in saying he is serious about his relationship with her. They put aside their differences as they head down the mountain, but they are caught in a cliffside rock fall. Johann is killed in the fall while Douglas survives. He returns to the town and shares the news to a heartbroken Kate while Johann's body is retrieved. As Douglas joins Johann's funeral, Kate decides to leave ahead and shares one last embrace with Douglas before she leaves.

Cast
 Sean Connery as Douglas Meredith
 Betsy Brantley as Kate Meredith
 Lambert Wilson as Johann Biari
 Jennifer Hilary as Sarah Meredith
 Isabel Dean as Kate's Mother
 Gérard Buhr as Brendel
 Anna Massey as Jennifer Pierce
 Sheila Reid as Gillian Pierce

Reception
Five Days One Summer received negative reviews from critics and was a box-office bomb. It was the final film directed by Fred Zinnemann. He later remarked that "I'm not saying it was a good picture, but there was a degree of viciousness in the reviews. The pleasure some people took in tearing down the film really hurt."

References

External links
 
 
 
 
 
 

1982 films
1982 romantic drama films
American romantic drama films
Incest in film
Films scored by Elmer Bernstein
Films directed by Fred Zinnemann
Films set in 1932
Films set in the Alps
Films set in Switzerland
Mountaineering films
Warner Bros. films
The Ladd Company films
1980s English-language films
1980s American films